João Rodrigo Reis Carvalho Leão (born 15 February 1974) is a Portuguese economist, university professor, and politician. He served as Minister of Finance in the government of Prime Minister António Costa of Portugal, sworn in on 15 June 2020.

Early life and education
Leão was born in Lisbon in 1974. He completed his BSc degree in economics in Nova School of Economics. Later, he went on to obtain a PhD in economics at the Massachusetts Institute of Technology (MIT) in 2008. His PhD thesis advisor was Abhijit Banerjee, Nobel Prize in Economics.

Career
In the government led by Pedro Passos Coelho, Leão was a member of the Economic and Social Council, working in the Ministry of the Economy and serving as a delegate to the OECD.

In Costa's government, Leão previously served as Secretary of State for the Budget from 2015 until 2020.

As Minister of Finance, Leão oversaw the government's overhaul plan for ailing TAP Air Portugal amid the COVID-19 pandemic, proposing 2,000 job cuts by 2022, pay cuts of up to 25% and 2 billion euros ($2.46 billion) in extra funds with state guarantees to cover financing needs until 2024.

When Portugal held the rotating presidency of the European Council in the first semester of 2021, Leão chaired the meetings of the Economic and Financial Affairs Council (ECOFIN).

While Leão was at Ministry of Finance, Portugal achieved in 2019 the first budget surplus of the 45 years of the country's democratic history. In 2021, after the peak of the pandemic, Portugal was also among the first group of Euro area countries to reach a budget deficit below the European limit of 3%. Portugal's fiscal deficit fell from 5,8% in 2020 to 2.8% of GDP in 2021, significantly better than the government's target of 4.3% of GDP, and lower than the average deficit in the eurozone. Meanwhile, the decline in Portugal's debt ratio was the third largest in the eurozone. Debt-to-GDP fell 7.8pp in 2021, compared with an average decline of 1.6pp in the eurozone.

In 2022, Leão became Portugal’s nominee to succeed Klaus Regling as Managing Director of the European Stability Mechanism; his candidacy was later endorsed by the French government and later achieved the majority of the weighted votes in the July 2022 meeting of Board of Governors of the ESM. The nomination process narrowed to Leão and Pierre Gramegna, but both pulled out in September 2022 having failed to secure the votes required.

Other activities
European Union organizations
 European Investment Bank (EIB), Ex-Officio Member of the Board of Governors (2020–2022)
 European Stability Mechanism (ESM), Member of the Board of Governors (2020–2022)

International organizations
 Chair of the Board of Governors of the European Bank for Reconstruction and Development 2021-2022
 African Development Bank (AfDB), Ex-Officio Member of the Board of Governors (2020–2022)
 Asian Development Bank (ADB), Ex-Officio Member of the Board of Governors (2020–2022)
 Asian Infrastructure Investment Bank (AIIB), Ex-Officio Member of the Board of Governors (2020–2022)
 European Bank for Reconstruction and Development (EBRD), Ex-Officio Member of the Board of Governors (2020–2022)
 Inter-American Investment Corporation (IIC), Ex-Officio Member of the Board of Governors (2020–2022)
 Multilateral Investment Guarantee Agency (MIGA), World Bank Group, Ex-Officio Member of the Board of Governors (2020–2022)
 World Bank, Ex-Officio Member of the Board of Governors (2020–2022)

References

Finance ministers of Portugal
21st-century Portuguese economists
Portuguese politicians
Portuguese people of Goan descent
1974 births
Living people
People from Lisbon